Andy LaRocque (born Anders Allhage, 29 November 1962) is a Swedish guitarist, songwriter, and producer, best known as a member of the heavy metal band King Diamond since 1985.

Biography
LaRocque started in the Swedish hard rock band Swedish Beauty, which later changed its name to Swedish Erotica. He also played on the Death album Individual Thought Patterns and the IllWill album Evilution, along with former members of Mercyful Fate. He can be heard on other albums as well, such as Falconer's Chapters from a Vale Forlorn, where he performed lead guitars on the song "Busted to the Floor".

LaRocque contributed a guitar solo to the track "Cold" on the album Slaughter of the Soul by Swedish melodic death metal group At the Gates. Producer Fredrik Nordström was responsible for the idea, and telephoned LaRocque. At the Gates' guitarist Anders Björler gave LaRocque an audio cassette recording of the song. The tape played at the wrong speed at LaRocque's house, so LaRocque had to transcribe the recording. Two days after receiving the cassette, LaRocque laid down a guitar solo for the song within half an hour. Björler described the solo as "great" and in a November 2007 interview admitted he still couldn't play the solo "properly".

LaRocque opened a studio called the "Los Angered Recordings" in Angered, Sweden in 1995, where he produced and recorded albums for many bands. In 2007, he moved the studio to Varberg and renamed it "Sonic Train Studios" where he continues to record and produce for various rock and heavy metal bands. 

He is known for his signature playing style which incorporates neoclassical elements, using exotic scales such as harmonic minor, phrygian dominant, and diminished minor. His extended theory knowledge enables him to mix these scales with others such as the blues scale and melodic minor. He has a distinct guitar tone for his solos, and often incorporates layers of harmonies over his runs and phrasing. He frequently uses a mixture of classically-flavored arpeggio sequences and alternate picked runs mixed with melodic lines to create his signature style. 

LaRocque was nominated for a Grammy Award in 2007. He is regularly listed as among the best or most underrated guitarists in heavy metal. He cites Michael Schenker and Randy Rhoads as major influences. He also likes Steve Vai and Tony Iommi, and was impressed by the friendliness of Chuck Schuldiner when he recorded Individual Thought Patterns with him.

Discography

With King Diamond
Fatal Portrait  (1986)
Abigail  (1987)
Them  (1988)
Conspiracy  (1989)
The Eye  (1990)
In Concert 1987: Abigail  (1991)
The Spider's Lullabye  (1995)
The Graveyard  (1996)
Voodoo  (1998)
House of God  (2000)
Abigail II: The Revenge  (2002)
The Puppet Master  (2003)
Deadly Lullabyes: Live  (2004)
Give Me Your Soul...Please  (2007)

With Death
 Individual Thought Patterns (1993)

With IllWill
Evilution (1999)

As guest musician
 At the Gates – Slaughter of the Soul (1995), guitar solo on "Cold"
 Dimmu Borgir – World Misanthropy (2002), guitar solo on "Devil's Path" (Re-recorded version)
 Roadrunner United – (2005), trade off guitar solo on "Constitution Down"
 Evergrey – The Dark Discovery (1998)
 Einherjer – Norwegian Native Art (2000), guitar solo on "Doomfaring"
 Falconer – Chapters from a Vale Forlorn (2002), lead guitar on "Busted to the Floor"
 Falconer – The Sceptre of Deception (2003), lead guitar on "Hear Me Pray"
 Falconer – Grime vs. Grandeur (2005), vocals on bonustrack "Wake Up"
 Yyrkoon – Unhealthy Opera (2006), guitar solo on "Horror from the Sea"
 Melechesh – Sphynx (2004), guitar solo on "Purifier of the Stars"
 Witchery – Witchkrieg (2010), guitar solo on "From Dead to Worse"
 Darzamat – Solfernus' Path (2010), guitar solo on "King of the Burning Anthems"
 Snowy Shaw – Snowy Shaw is Alive! (2011)
 Shining – Redefining Darkness (2012), second guitar solo on "For the God Below" 
 Sandalinas  – Living on the Edge (2005), fill guitar solo on "If it Wasn't for You" and second guitar solo on "All Along the Everglades
 Sandalinas – Fly to the Sun (2008), guitar solo on "The Healer Talks" and co-writer with Jordi Sandalinas of instrumental track "Back From the Light"
 Sandalinas – Power to the People, the Raw E.P (2013), co-writer of "Haunted Visions" jointly with Rick Altzi.
 Hell:on – The Hunt (2013), guitar solo on "Slaughter Smell"
 Ravenoir – The Darkest Flame Of Eternal Blasphemy (2020), guitar solo on "The Darkest Flame Of Eternal Blasphemy"

As producer
Andy LaRocque owns Sonic Train Studios in Varberg, Sweden. The notable bands which recorded in Sonic Train Studios include:

 Astroqueen – Into Submission (2001)
 Ancient – "Proxima Centauri" (2001)
 Einherjer – Odin Owns Ye All (1998)
 Sacramentum – Thy Black Destiny (1999)
 Sacramentum – The Coming of Chaos (1997)
 Evergrey – In Search of Truth (2001)
 Falconer  – Falconer (2001)
 Falconer  – The Sceptre of Deception (2003) – also guitar
 Runemagick – Darkness Death Doom (2003) – drum producer only
 Eidolon – Apostles of Defiance (2004) –  also guitar
 Evergrey – The Dark Discovery (2004) –  also guitar
 Evergrey – Solitude, Dominance, Tragedy (2004)
 Melechesh – Sphynx (2004) – also Guitar
 Kreyson - "Návrat Krále" (2013)
 Dragonland – The Battle of the Ivory Plains (2005)
 Einherjer – Norwegian Native Art (2005) –  also guitar
 Falconer – Grime vs. Grandeur (2005)
 Sandalinas – Living on the Edge (2005)
 Runemagick – Envenom (2005)
 Lord Belial
 Darzamat – Transkarpatia (2005)
 Siebenburgen – Revelation VI (2008)
 Shining – Redefining Darkness (2012)
 Metal Blade Records 20th Anniversary (2002)

References

External links

Sonic Train Studios
Official website

1962 births
Living people
Swedish heavy metal guitarists
Swedish keyboardists
King Diamond (band) members
Swedish record producers
Death (metal band) members
Lead guitarists
Swedish Erotica members